Nikola Rakićević (born January 14, 1997) is a Serbian professional basketball player. He played college basketball for the Buffalo Bulls.

Early life 
Rakićević played basketball for the youth teams of Crvena zvezda from 2012 to 2015. He was a member of the Crvena zvezda U18 team that won the 2014 Euroleague Next Generation tournament. In February 2015, Rakićević participated at the NBA All-Star Basketball Without Borders Global Camp in New York City, NY.

College career 
As a freshman, Rakićević appeared in 20 games at the State University of New York at Buffalo in their 2015–16 season. On November 13, 2015, he recorded a career-best seven rebounds in the season opener against Pitt-Bradford. On December 29, he scored a career-high 14 points and added five rebounds against Delaware.

As a sophomore, Rakićević appeared in 21 games in the Bulls' 2016–17 season before missing the final three games and the conference tournament due to a season-ending injury. He made three starts on the year and tied his career high with 14 points at Kent State as he went 6-of-11 from the floor. He had eight points against Ohio and scored four points in seven of his 21 games. He averaged 2.6 points and 1.3 rebounds per game.

Rakićević wasn't in the Bulls rosters for the 2017–18 season. His departure was on medical grounds, primarily with his knee issues. Also, Rakićević was ruled out for the entire 2018–19 season, his senior year.

International career 
Rakićević was a member of the Serbian U-16 national basketball team that won the silver medal at the 2013 FIBA Europe Under-16 Championship in Ukraine. Over seven tournament games, he averaged 6 points, 3.3 rebounds and 0.6 assists per game. Also, he was a member of the Serbian U-17 national team that won the bronze medal at the 2014 FIBA Under-17 World Championship in Dubai, UAE. Over seven tournament games, he averaged 12.4 points, 5.7 rebounds and 0.6 assists per game. At the tournament's end, he was named to the All-Tournament Team.

Career achievements and awards

Youth level 
 Euroleague Next Generation tournament champion: 2014
 Euroleague Next Generation Tournament runner-up: 2015

College 
 Mid-American Conference champion: 2016
 Individual
 Mid-American Conference All-Academic First team: 2016–17

Serbian national team
Individual
 2014 FIBA Under-17 World Championship: All-Tournament Team

Personal life 
Rakićević is born in Smederevska Palanka, Serbia, FR Yugoslavia, to Saša and Jasmina. He has one sister.

Rakićević earned his bachelor's degree in business administration from the University at Buffalo in 2019. He was a business office student assistant at the University at Buffalo School of Management from August 2017 until his graduation.

References

External links 
 Profile at LinkedIn
 Profile at draftexpress.com
 Profile at basketball.realgm.com

1997 births
Living people
Basketball players from Belgrade
Buffalo Bulls men's basketball players
KK Crvena zvezda youth players
People from Smederevska Palanka
Serbian expatriate basketball people in the United States
Serbian men's basketball players
Shooting guards
Small forwards
University at Buffalo alumni